John Trevisa (or John of Trevisa; ; fl. 1342–1402 AD) was a Cornish writer and translator.

Trevisa was born at Trevessa in the parish of St Enoder in mid-Cornwall, in Britain and was a native Cornish speaker. He was educated at Exeter College, Oxford, and became Vicar of Berkeley, Gloucestershire, chaplain to the 5th Lord Berkeley, and Canon of Westbury on Trym.

He translated into English for his patron the Latin Polychronicon of Ranulf Higden, adding remarks of his own, and prefacing it with a Dialogue on Translation between a Lord and a Clerk. He likewise made various other translations, including Bartholomaeus Anglicus' On the Properties of Things (De Proprietatibus Rerum), a medieval forerunner of the encyclopedia.

A fellow of Queen's College, Oxford, from 1372 to 1376 at the same time as John Wycliff and Nicholas of Hereford, Trevisa may well have been one of the contributors to the Early Version of Wycliffe's Bible.  The preface to the King James Version of 1611 singles him out as a translator amongst others at that time: "even in our King Richard the second's days, John Trevisa translated them [the Gospels] into English, and many English Bibles in written hand are yet to be seen that divers translated, as it is very probable, in that age".  Subsequently, he translated a number of books of the Bible into French for Lord Berkeley, including a version of the Book of Revelation, which his patron had written up onto the ceiling of the chapel at Berkeley Castle.
Trevisa's reputation as a writer rests principally on his translations of encyclopaedic works from Latin into English, undertaken with the support of his patron, Thomas (IV), the fifth Baron Berkeley, as a continuous programme of enlightenment for the laity.

John Trevisa is the 18th most frequently cited author in the Oxford English Dictionary and the third most frequently cited source for the first evidence of a word (after Geoffrey Chaucer and the Philosophical Transactions of the Royal Society).

References 

 David C. Fowler (1993) John Trevisa, Ashgate 
 David C. Fowler (1995) The Life and Times of John Trevisa, Medieval Scholar, Seattle: University of Washington Press 
 Eric Gethyn-Jones (1978) Trevisa of Berkeley, a Celtic Firebrand. Dursley: Alan Sutton

External links 

 John of Trevisa, Online Companion to Middle English Literature
 John Trevisa, Cambridge History of English and American Literature (1907–21) – see also the previous and following pages. 
 Trevisa, John de, Dictionary of National Biography, 1899
Jane Beal, John Trevisa and the English Polychronicon (2012) – book examining Trevisa's rhetorical strategies to establish his own authority in his Polychronicon, a universal history of the world, with additional consideration of his letter to Lord Berkeley, "Dialogue between a Lord and a Clerk," and interpolated notes as well as his other translations. The final chapter considers the reception of the English Polychronicon in the Renaissance.
 
 
 
 Digital view of Trevisa's On The Properties of Things, from the British Library

1342 births
1402 deaths
Medieval Cornish people
Cornish-speaking people
Writers from Cornwall
Fellows of The Queen's College, Oxford
Translators of the Bible into English
Translators of the Bible into French
14th-century English Roman Catholic priests
People from Berkeley, Gloucestershire